Assistant is an intelligent personal assistant application for mobile devices developed by Speaktoit. Originally launched in October 2011 for the Android platform (although available in beta in March 2011), Assistant had since come to iOS and Windows Phones. Assistant used natural language processing and speech recognition to interact with its users and was able to have clarifying conversations. Unlike Apple's Siri, Assistant came in the form of a customizable, cartoonish avatar.  

The New York Times recognized Assistant as one of the top 10 Android Apps of 2011.

Assistant had over 13+ million users, in 11 different languages as of October 2014. It was the No. 6 top grossing app in the Lifestyle category on Google Play in the US. 

Assistant was discontinued on December 15, 2016. All web links to the app now redirect to api.ai's website.

See also
Vlingo
api.ai

References

Android (operating system) software
IOS software
Windows Phone software